In the Garden may refer to:

Albums 

In the Garden (Eurythmics album), a 1981 album by the Eurythmics
 In the Garden (EP), a 2007 EP by The Eighties Matchbox B-Line Disaster
 In the Garden (Gypsy album), a 1971 album by Gypsy

Songs 
 "In the Garden" (1912 song), a 1912 gospel song by Charles Austin Miles
 "In the Garden" (Van Morrison song), from the 1986 album No Guru, No Method, No Teacher
 "In The Garden", a song by Bob Dylan from the 1980 Saved